Genobaud, also called Gennobaudes or Genebaud, was a Frankish petty king in the 3rd century.

Little is known about Genobaud. Germanic raids around the area of modern-day Trier had provoked a Roman counteroffensive, which took place between 287 and 289 under emperor Maximian. Maximian crossed the Rhine multiple times to confront the attackers. In this context, the submission of Genobaud is mentioned. He concluded a treaty with Rome and recognized Roman supremacy. In return, he was recognized by the Romans with the position of petty king. 

In the Panegyric of 289, only the subjection of Genobaud is mentioned. In the Panegyric of 291, however, the Franci are first mentioned by a contemporary Roman source. The description in the Pangeyric of 291 fits well with the earlier description of Genobaud, which is why he is considered a Frank. Perhaphs he was a leader of the Chamavi, but this is not certain. 

A connection with the Frankish leader Genobaud is not provable, but possible.

Sources
 Helmut Castritius: Gennobaudes. In: Reallexikon der Germanischen Altertumskunde (RGA). 2. Auflage. Band 11, Walter de Gruyter, Berlin / New York 1998, p. 77–79, esp. p. 77f.
 Eugen Ewig: Die Franken und Rom (3.–5. Jahrhundert). Versuch einer Übersicht. In: Rheinische Vierteljahrsblätter. Band 71, 2007, p. 1–42.
 Erich Zöllner: Geschichte der Franken bis zur Mitte des sechsten Jahrhunderts. Auf der Grundlage des Werkes von Ludwig Schmidt unter Mitwirkung von Joachim Werner neu bearbeitet. Beck, München 1970, .

3rd-century Frankish people
Frankish kings
Frankish warriors